"Stranglehold" is a song by Paul McCartney, the former bass guitarist, singer and songwriter with the Beatles. The track is credited as being written by McCartney and 10cc guitarist Eric Stewart, and is on his sixth studio solo album Press to Play.  It was issued as single exclusively in the US and reached number 81. The b-side featured the remix of "Angry" by Larry Alexander taken from the previous single "Pretty Little Head".

Critical reception
Los Angeles Times critic Terry Atkinson described the track as  "an enjoyable, jazzy offer of new love".  Cash Box called it a "mainstream rock ballad" with "well crafted melodies, flawless production and sterling musicianship."  Billboard called it a "hopping boogie-blues with a hint of menace."

Personnel
Paul McCartney – vocals, bass, acoustic and electric guitars
Eric Stewart – acoustic and electric guitars, backing vocals
Jerry Marotta – drums
Gary Barnacle – possible horns
Dick Morrissey – possible horns

Track listing
7" single (B-5636)
 Stranglehold – 3:36
 Angry (Remix) – 3:36
 Remix by Larry Alexander

References

External links

1986 singles
Paul McCartney songs
Songs written by Paul McCartney
Songs written by Eric Stewart
Song recordings produced by Paul McCartney
Song recordings produced by Hugh Padgham
Music published by MPL Music Publishing
Capitol Records singles
1986 songs